Doğukapı station is a freight station near the Turkey/Armenia border, on the former Kars–Gyumri railway line. The station name, "Doğukapı" means "the Eastern Gate" in Turkish, referring to the station's being the Turkey's entry point from the USSR.

The station building is abandoned and the tracks are rarely used. Since the closing of the border in 1993, no trains have operated east of the station.

References
 —mentions the existence of "the closed Akhuryan-Dogukapi line"

Defunct railway stations in Turkey
Railway stations opened in 1899
Railway stations closed in 1993
Railway stations in Kars Province
1899 establishments in the Russian Empire
1993 disestablishments in Turkey
Akyaka District